Radio One Lebanon was a radio station that served Lebanon, broadcasting on the FM band before it closed down on the 1st of February 2020 as a result of the Lebanese liquidity crisis. The station was licensed to broadcast all over Lebanon, from studios in Beit Meri. It was one of the many FM stations that launched during the civil war in Lebanon playing international pop music, as well as oldies.

History
Radio One was founded in 1983 by Raymond Gaspar as CEO and Roger Gaspar as program director. The station played international music 24 hours a day, 7 days a week. Radio One broadcast daytime and nighttime shows, including Breakfast Show with Gavin Ford and Olga, Radio One’s Top 20, Monday Night Love Songs Special, and The Classics, playing listener requests from the 1970s through the 1990s.

Ford died at age 53 on 27 November 2018, after he had been tied up, beaten and fatally strangled inside his Beit Meri home. Two Syrian men were arrested on 28 November after some of Ford's belongings were found in their Beirut apartment. One suspect confessed to Ford's murder and both men having targeted his house beforehand for a robbery attempt. Ford had been an on-air personality for Radio One since 1996.

The station closed down on the 1st of February 2020 following the Lebanese financial crisis. The radio faced financial difficulties that led to its discontinuing and to stopping the broadcast of its programs.

Air personalities 
 Gavin Ford
Olga Habre
 Roy Malakian

Shows 
 Monday night love songs
 Radio One Classics
 Remember Yesterday with Kevin
 The Chillout Lounge with Alan

References

1983 establishments in Lebanon
Radio stations established in 1983
Radio stations in Lebanon